Proud Mary are an English blues/rock band formed in 1998 in Manchester, England. The current line up consists of Greg Griffin (Lead Vocals), Paul Newsome (guitars, vocals), Tony Auton (lead guitar), Nathan Birkett (bass, guitars), Hani Abassi (drums). Proud Mary released their fifth studio album Songs from Catalina on 26 June 2020.

Centred around Paul Newsome (Formerly of Manchester Indie band The YA YA'S), and Greg Griffin, Proud Mary were the first signing to Sour Mash Records by label founder Noel Gallagher (Oasis, Noel Gallagher's High Flying Birds) in 2000. Releasing debut album The Same Old Blues to wide critical acclaim in 2001.

The Same Old Blues was recorded at Wheeler End Studios, featuring singles "All Good Things" and "Very Best Friend", and was predominantly written by Paul Newsome. A gruelling touring schedule followed the release, alongside tour support for among others Oasis, Paul Weller, Stereophonics, The Black Crowes, and Neil Young. The touring line up included Gary Whelan (Happy Mondays) on drums.

Love and Light their second studio album was released in 2004 on Redemption Records, again predominantly written by Paul Newsome, and recorded at Wheeler End with other songs being written by Greg Griffin. Two tours followed the release, alongside supporting Ryan Adams, and a MainStage appearance at The Isle of Wight Festival. The album includes fan favourites "Hats Off", "The Blues" and "Mexico". The album featured Andy Rourke (The Smiths) on bass. Mainly due to the heavy touring schedule and Newsome's relocation to Los Angeles, a hiatus followed. During this period, amid inaccurate rumours the band had broken up, both Greg Griffin and Paul Newsome wrote and released solo albums, Glass Bottom Boat (Griffin) and Electric and Palms (Newsome), with Newsome also writing several film scores and commercials.

In 2010 Proud Mary released Ocean Park, recorded and produced in Los Angeles and showcasing the writing of both Newsome and Griffin, followed by Pilgrim Fields in 2013. Following this release Greg Griffin relocated to San Diego, California and formed the band 'Midnight Clergy' writing and releasing the album One with collaboration from Marc Ford (The Black Crowes).

In 2015 Paul Newsome was announced as the main headline support in Europe for Noel Gallagher's High Flying Birds, following the release of their album Chasing Yesterday. Newsome can be seen playing keyboards in live band performances on the videos for the singles "In The Heat of the Moment" and "Ballad of the Mighty I".

In 2018 Proud Mary released the single 'Hollywood'.

On 1 May 2020 Proud Mary released the single "Lazy Days and Loaded Nights" from the forthcoming album Songs from Catalina. The album was recorded over a five-month period in the Santa Catalina area of Palma, Majorca and was released on 26 June 2020.

Discography

Albums

Singles

Members

Current

Paul Newsome – Guitar, Vocals
Greg Griffin – Vocals
Nathan Birkett – Bass
Hani Abbasi  – Drums
Tony Auton – Lead Guitar

References

Musical groups established in 2001
English rock music groups
Oasis (band)
Musical groups from Manchester